Communität Casteller Ring (CCR) is a Religious order for women in the Evangelical Lutheran Church in Bavaria.

CCR emerged shortly after World War II  from the Bavarian Girl Guide Movement Bund Christlicher Pfadfinderinnen. The Religious community lives in the spirit of the Rule of St Benedict. The mother house is in Schwanberg. From 1996 until Easter 2011, sisters of the Casteller Ring staffed  St. Augustine's Monastery in Erfurt, where Martin Luther lived as a monk.

CCR also has oblates and circle of friends.

References

External links 
 Geistliches Zentrum Schwanberg 
 Communität Casteller Ring im Augustinerkloster zu Erfurt 
 St Augustine's Evangelical Monastery in Erfurt 

Lutheran orders and societies
Orders following the Rule of Saint Benedict